Two destroyers in the United States Navy have been named USS Fletcher:

 , named for Admiral Frank Friday Fletcher, was the lead  and served during World War II.
 , named for Admiral Frank Jack Fletcher, was a  ASW destroyer.

United States Navy ship names